George F. Kerr (15 April 1918 – 29 October 1996) was an English writer best known for his work in TV. He worked for eight years in British TV as a writer and script editor.

He moved to Australia in 1957 and wrote several early TV dramas as well as stage and radio plays.  He returned to England in the mid 1960s.

He was a POW during World War II.
 
In 1955 when Kerr was a script editor for Associated Television he wrote that "a successful television play should have a strong contemporary story plus a subplot, preferrably of emotional entanglement. The story should be classifiable as a study of the peoples next door or, if the troubles are slightly unsavoury, of the people next door but one."

Doctor Who 
In April 1966, Kerr was asked from the production office at BBC to work on some stories for Doctor Who on Season 4 of the program. These stories Kerr submitted have no explanation details, and were both rejected by story editor Gerry Davis on 15 June 1966. These stories were entitled as:

The Hearsay Machine 

The Heavy Scent of Violence 

The Man from the Met

These story titles are all that remain.

(see List of unmade Doctor Who serials and films)

Select credits
Business in Great Waters (1952) – novel
A Month of Sundays (1952) – British TV play
Jan and the Blue Fox (1952) – British TV play
Almost Glory (1953) – radio play
The Voice (1955) – British radio play
Killer in Close-Up (1957)
Symphonie Pastorale (1958)
Man (Mark II) (1958) – - Australian radio play
An Enemy of the People (1958)
The Multi-Coloured Umbrella (1958) – TV movie
Blue Murder (1959) – TV movie
His Name Isn't Rogers (1959) – radio play
Man in the Grovesnor Hotel (1959) – radio play
The Last Minute (1960)
Farewell, Farewell, Eugene (1960) – TV play
Hunger of a Girl (1960) – play
Ghost of a Day (1960) – radio play
The Dock Brief (1960) – TV play
Moment of Indecision (1961) – radio play
Heart Attack (1960) – TV playA Little South of Heaven (1961) – TV playThe Concert (1961) – TV playTraveller Without Luggage (1961) – TV playOnce Upon a Time (1961) – radio playJenny (1962) (TV play)She'll Be Right (1962) – TV movieGhost of a Day (1964) – radio playQuick Before They Catch Us (1966) – TV seriesZ-Cars'' (1969) – TV series

References

External links

George F. Kerr at AustLit

1918 births
1996 deaths
20th-century Australian male writers
20th-century English male writers
British World War II prisoners of war